Taiwu may refer to:

Taiwu, Pingtung, a town in Pingtung, Taiwan
Tai Wu ( 16th–15th century BC), king of Shang dynasty
Emperor Taiwu of Northern Wei (408–452), emperor of Northern Wei dynasty
Empress Taiwu (died 453), or Empress Helian, wife of Emperor Taiwu

See also
The Scroll of Taiwu